William Thomas Crawford (born June 1, 1856 near Waynesville, North Carolina; died November 16, 1913, Waynesville, North Carolina) was a Representative from North Carolina.

He attended the public schools and Waynesville Academy. 
From 1884-1888, he was a member of the State house of representatives. In 1890 he graduated from the law department of the University of North Carolina at Chapel Hill. In 1891 he was admitted to the bar and commenced practice in Waynesville.  
He was elected as a Democrat to the Fifty-second congress and Fifty-third Congress (March 4, 1891 – March 3, 1895), Fifty-sixth Congress (March 4, 1899 – May 10, 1900) and Sixtieth Congress (March 4, 1907 – March 3, 1909). After being an unsuccessful candidate for reelection to Congress in 1908, he resumed the practice of law in Waynesville, North Carolina, where he died November 16, 1913. Interment was in the city's Green Hill Cemetery.

His son Fred Crawford was the first college football All-American from North Carolina.

References

1856 births
1913 deaths
People from Waynesville, North Carolina
University of North Carolina at Chapel Hill alumni
North Carolina lawyers
Democratic Party members of the North Carolina House of Representatives
Democratic Party members of the United States House of Representatives from North Carolina
19th-century American politicians
19th-century American lawyers